John Woodburn (1895 in Darvel – 1960) was a Scottish footballer who played as a defender in the Football League for West Ham United, and in the Scottish League for Ayr United.

Woodburn started his career at Hurlford before moving to Second Division club West Ham United on 28 July 1919. He made his debut for the east London club on 25 October at right-half, against Birmingham. He made three appearances in March 1920 at centre-half before transferring to Peterborough & Fletton United.

He returned to Scotland and played briefly for Vale of Clyde before signing for Ayr United on 25 May 1920. He spent the next eight seasons with the club, playing as a right-back. During the 1924–25 season, he made a single appearance for Galston while on loan.

References

1895 births
1960 deaths
Footballers from East Ayrshire
Scottish footballers
Association football central defenders
Association football fullbacks
West Ham United F.C. players
Peterborough & Fletton United F.C. players
Vale of Clyde F.C. players
Ayr United F.C. players
Galston F.C. players
English Football League players
Scottish Football League players